Batuhan Zidan Sertdemir (born 4 February 2005) is a Danish professional footballer who plays as a midfielder for Danish Superliga club Nordsjælland.

Club career
Sertdemir is a youth product of Brøndby and moved to the academy of Nordsjælland at the age of 12. He then joined German club Bayer Leverkusen on 15 June 2021, signing a three-year contract.

He made his senior debut with Bayer Leverkusen in a 1–1 Bundesliga tie with Hertha on 7 November 2021. At 16 years and 276 days, Sertdemir is the youngest ever debutant for Bayer Leverkusen in the Bundesliga, and the second-youngest debutant in the league after Youssoufa Moukoko.

Having not managed to break through Bayer's first team on a full basis, on 31 January 2023 Sertdemir officially returned to Nordsjælland, joining the club on a permanent deal.

International career
Born in Ishøj, Denmark, Sertdemir is of Turkish descent. He is a youth international for Denmark, having represented the Denmark U16s and U17s.

Career statistics

Club

References

External links
 
 
 DBU Profile

2005 births
Living people
Danish men's footballers
Denmark youth international footballers
Danish people of Turkish descent
Bayer 04 Leverkusen players
Bundesliga players
Association football midfielders
Danish expatriate sportspeople in Germany
Danish expatriate men's footballers
Expatriate footballers in Germany